Carnegie Public Library, also known as Cabell County Public Library, is a historic library building located at Huntington, Cabell County, West Virginia. It was built in 1902–1903, in the Beaux-Arts style. It is two stories with a raised basement and has smooth gray ashlar walls. It features a pedimented, central front pavilion with paired Ionic order columns on its portico. The interior was renovated in the 1930s.  It is one of 3,000 such libraries constructed between 1885 and 1919. Andrew Carnegie provided $35,000 toward the construction of the Huntington library.  It served the community as a library until 1980, when a new library opened across the street. The building houses Huntington Junior College.

It was listed on the National Register of Historic Places in 1980.

References

External links
Huntington Junior College website

Library buildings completed in 1903
Carnegie libraries in West Virginia
Libraries on the National Register of Historic Places in West Virginia
Beaux-Arts architecture in West Virginia
Buildings and structures in Huntington, West Virginia
National Register of Historic Places in Cabell County, West Virginia